Kazimierz Deyna (23 October 1947 – 1 September 1989) was a Polish professional footballer who played as an attacking midfielder in the playmaker role and was one of the most highly regarded players of his generation, due to his excellent vision.

Early life
Deyna was born in Starogard Gdański to Franciszek (1911–1976) – a dairy worker, and Jadwiga (1917–1981) – a housewife. He had six sisters and two brothers – Henryk and Franciszek, who also were footballers; Henryk played for Włókniarz Starogard Gdański, while Franciszek was a Starogardzki KS player.

Club career

Legia Warsaw

Deyna began playing youth football in 1958 at his local club Włókniarz Starogard Gdański. In 1966 he made one appearance for ŁKS Łódź (on 8 October in a 0–0 draw against Górnik Zabrze). But he was quickly snapped up by Legia Warsaw. In communist Poland each team had its own "sponsor". The Warsaw club was much more powerful as it was the military club. Moreover, it was the favourite club of the authorities. Deyna was called up into the army and in this way he had to play for Legia Warsaw. He made a name for himself during his first season, becoming one of Legia's most important players.
In 1969 and 1970 his team won the Polish Championship. After his performances at the 1974 World Cup, European top teams like AS Saint-Étienne, A.C. Milan, Inter Milan, AS Monaco, Real Madrid and Bayern Munich tried to acquire his services but he was unable to join, since the communist regime in Poland prevented him from moving to Western Europe. Real Madrid was so determined to acquire Deyna that they sent a shirt to Warsaw with his name and number "14".

Manchester City

Soon afterwards Deyna was transferred to English club Manchester City, making his debut in November 1978, and being one of the first wave of overseas players to play in the English league. His time in England was marred by a series of injuries, and he left in January 1981, shortly after Manchester City made a managerial change, having made only 43 appearances in all competitions. However, he was regarded as an exceptionally gifted playmaker and became a cult figure with City fans. Deyna scored thirteen goals in his time with the club. Furthermore, his seven goals in the last eight games of the 1978–79 season were crucial for Manchester City in their relegation battle.

San Diego Sockers
Deyna appeared in the 1981 film Escape to Victory as Paul Wolcheck. In the same year, he emigrated to the United States, where he signed with the San Diego Sockers of the North American Soccer League in January 1981. During the next seven years, he played four NASL outdoor seasons, one NASL indoor season and five Major Indoor Soccer League seasons with the Sockers, winning five championships. The Sockers released him in June 1987.  He was a 1983 NASL Second Team All Star.

International career
On 24 April 1968, Deyna made his debut for the Poland national team in a match against Turkey in Chorzów. He won the gold medal in the 1972 Summer Olympics in Munich, and the bronze in Football World Cup 1974, after a match against Brazil. In 1972, he was also the Top Goalscorer of the Olympic Games, with a total of nine goals. In 1976 Summer Olympics his team yet again reached the finals and won the silver medal. Additionally, he was ranked third in the European Footballer of the Year for 1974, behind Johan Cruyff and Franz Beckenbauer.

Deyna played for Poland on 97 (84 after the deduction of Olympic Football Tournament competition games) occasions, scoring 41 goals, and often captained the side. He had the ability to score from unusual positions, for example directly from a corner. Because of his achievements and talents, he was chosen Football Player of the Year several times by Polish fans. In 1978, he captained Poland at the Football World Cup in Argentina, where the team reached the second phase.

Death

Deyna died in a car accident in San Diego, California, aged 41. In 1994, he was chosen by the Polish Football Association (PZPN) and the readers of all Polish sports-related newspapers as the Greatest Polish Football Player of All Time. His number 10 is retired by Legia Warsaw and the Sockers. In June 2012 Kazimierz Deyna's remains were exhumed and reburied in Warsaw's Powązki Military Cemetery.

Career statistics

Club

International
Scores and results list Poland's goal tally first, score column indicates score after each Deyna goal.

Honours
Legia Warsaw
Polish Championship: 1968–69, 1969–70
Polish Cup: 1966, 1973

Poland
Olympic gold medal: 1972
Olympic silver medal: 1976
FIFA World Cup bronze medal: 1974

Individual
Olympic top scorer: 1972
Polish Footballer of the Year: 1973, 1974
Ballon d'Or Third place: 1974;
FIFA World Cup All-Star Team: 1974

Notes

References

External links
 Kazimierz Deyna Official Website 
 
 
 
 
 Goals in International Matches
 
 NASL profile

1947 births
1989 deaths
People from Starogard Gdański
Sportspeople from Pomeranian Voivodeship
Association football midfielders
Footballers at the 1972 Summer Olympics
Footballers at the 1976 Summer Olympics
Ekstraklasa players
Legia Warsaw players
ŁKS Łódź players
Manchester City F.C. players
English Football League players
North American Soccer League (1968–1984) players
San Diego Sockers (NASL) players
Major Indoor Soccer League (1978–1992) players
North American Soccer League (1968–1984) indoor players
San Diego Sockers (original MISL) players
Olympic footballers of Poland
Olympic gold medalists for Poland
Olympic silver medalists for Poland
Poland international footballers
Polish footballers
Road incident deaths in California
1974 FIFA World Cup players
1978 FIFA World Cup players
Polish expatriate footballers
Recipients of the Order of Polonia Restituta (1944–1989)
Olympic medalists in football
Medalists at the 1976 Summer Olympics
Polish emigrants to the United States